The 1965 Magyar Kupa (English: Hungarian Cup) was the 26th season of Hungary's annual knock-out cup football competition.

Final

See also
 1965 Nemzeti Bajnokság I

References

External links
 Official site 
 soccerway.com

1965–66 in Hungarian football
1965–66 domestic association football cups
1965